Riardo is a comune (municipality) in the Province of Caserta in the Italian region Campania, located about  north of Naples and about  northwest of Caserta.  

Riardo borders the following municipalities: Pietramelara, Pietravairano, Rocchetta e Croce, Teano, Vairano Patenora.

Economy
The communal territory houses the sources of Ferrarelle and Santagata commercial mineral waters.

References

External links
 Official website

Cities and towns in Campania